Wormwood is the fifth studio album by American metalcore band The Acacia Strain. The album was released on July 20, 2010. Wormwood reached #67 on the US Billboard Top 200 chart. The song "Jonestown" was released as a single in June 2010 and was available at the website for Prosthetic Records.

Track listing

Personnel 
Production and performance credits are adapted from the album liner notes.

The Acacia Strain
 Vincent Bennett – lead vocals
 Daniel "DL" Laskiewicz – lead guitar, programming, backing vocals
 Jack Strong – bass
 Kevin Boutot – drums
Production
 Zeuss – producer, engineer, mixing, mastering
 Paul Mocadlo – assistant engineer
 Angryblue – art direction, illustration, design

Guest musicians
 Jamey Jasta (Hatebreed) – vocals on "The Beast"
 Bruce LePage (100 Demons) – vocals on "Nightman"
 Kyle Chard (Born Low) – vocals on "Jonestown"

Charts

References 

The Acacia Strain albums
2010 albums
Albums produced by Chris "Zeuss" Harris